Guaienes are a series of closely related natural chemical compounds that have been isolated from a variety of plant sources.  The guaienes are sesquiterpenes with the molecular formula C15H24.  α-Guaiene is the most common and was first isolated from guaiac wood oil from Bulnesia sarmientoi.  The guaienes are used in the fragrance and flavoring industries to impart earthy, spicy aromas and tastes.

See also
 Guaiol

References

Sesquiterpenes